Ocean port could refer to:

 Oceanport, New Jersey
 A port on an ocean coastline
 also known as access to tidewater